Mark Adam Saul (born June 20, 1985) is an American actor who is best known for appearing on the popular Nickelodeon show All That in the final two seasons of the show's first era. His other notable credits include The Social Network, Parks and Recreation, Rules of Engagement, Bones, Desperate Housewives, and Body of Proof. He also portrayed Dr. Steve Mostow in Grey's Anatomy from seasons 4 to 8.

Early life 
Saul was born and raised in Los Angeles, California. He was born into a family of Eastern European descent. He has an older sister, Deanna, who is a costume designer. Saul was raised in the West Hills section of Los Angeles, where he attended Pomelo Drive Elementary School, George Ellery Hale Middle School, and El Camino Real High School. He got his start singing, dancing, and acting in a musical theater. He won first place at a Shakespeare Festival Competition. At the age of 10, Saul won first place in a writing contest sponsored by the California Writers' Club San Fernando Valley Branch. Thanks to his sense of humor and comedic timing, Saul has also appeared in numerous national commercials. He got his first break in starring in Nickelodeon's All That. It was his first TV series.

All That 
After the departure of Lori Beth Denberg, Saul joined the cast of All That as a featured player in 1998, with Nick Cannon.  Saul's most famous sketch was Stuart, a guy who would pretend to be something.  His catchphrase was, "Well, if I was _, I'd be the greatest ___  in all the land, and people will gather 'round and say, "Oh Stuart, you're the greatest _ EVER!. Now there's only one thing left to do. Let me hop on my _, and fly away." During the All That auditions, he did a male version of the Ask Ashley segment. Ironically, in one of the show's episodes, his character "Stuart" ends up taking over Ask Ashley where he is dressed in female's clothing. Saul and Cannon were promoted to contract status in the sixth season, becoming the first featured players to be promoted in the show's history, and lasted until the end of the Golden Era in 2000. He appeared in the 10th Anniversary Reunion Special, despite not having any lines.

Like many other Nickelodeon stars at the time, he was also a contestant on the show Figure It Out, mostly appearing in the final season, Figure It Out: Wild Style. He was known as one of the guys to ask the stupid yet funny questions on the show.

Post- All That 
After leaving the show, he continued on his education at El Camino Real High School in the San Fernando Valley, where he participated in the Thespians Club and Drama class. He was also president of his high school club Comedy Sportz League. He had starred in a lead role in his high school film project, "Passing Moments". The film was released on May 24, 2003, in the Los Angeles area only. He had recently graduated from California State University, Northridge with a Bachelor's Art in Screenwriting.

Saul had a band called Another Man's Trash, and their video, "Such a Fantasy" aired on VH1.

In 2012, Saul starred in a commercial for popular California chain restaurant, Jack in the Box, as a young man getting ready to marry a bacon burger.
 
He starred on Grey's Anatomy as Steve Mostow, an intern in Seattle Grace Hospital. When he's not on set, Saul is creating art for his Etsy shop, Novel Brand, writing and performing with his sketch comedy group, Rat Pageant, and playing in the folk/rock band, The Flashcards.

He made a guest appearance on Lab Rats: Bionic Island as Dr. Ryan.

Personal life 
He had been dating his high school girlfriend Ilana Berger since April 2003. They became engaged in 2010. On June 2, 2012, Saul married Berger, a blogger and senior editor for Lauren Conrad's official website and Hooray Hurrah. Since 2012, the couple currently lives in the Silver Lake enclave of Los Angeles with their two cats and their three children, Eden, Arlo, and Story.

Filmography

Film

Television

References

External links 
 

1985 births
Living people
20th-century American male actors
21st-century American male actors
Male actors from Los Angeles
American male child actors
American male film actors
American male singer-songwriters
American singer-songwriters
American male television actors
California State University, Northridge alumni
People from West Hills, Los Angeles
El Camino Real High School alumni
21st-century American singers
21st-century American male singers